Södra Råda Old Church was an early 14th-century timbered church in the parish of Södra Råda in Gullspång Municipality, Västra Götaland in Sweden. It was one of the oldest preserved wooden churches in the country.

The paintings covering the walls and the trefoil-shaped wooden ceiling of the church were considered one of the best and best-preserved examples of Scandinavian wall-painting from the Middle Ages. The oldest, anonymous, paintings in the chancel dated to 1323. Later paintings in the nave dated from 1493 and were signed by a painter named .

The church was burnt down on 12 November 2001. A mentally ill man convicted for the murder of a five-year-old girl in 2003 also confessed to and was convicted for the burning of the church. A project led by the Swedish National Heritage Board has since excavated the site, and a reconstruction of the church, using medieval methods of construction, has been begun.

References

External links

Södra Råda, Riksantikvarieämbetet
http://www.dn.se/DNet/jsp/polopoly.jsp?d=147&a=205488 and
http://www.dn.se/DNet/jsp/polopoly.jsp?d=147&a=198810 (newspaper coverage in Dagens Nyheter of the trial against the murderer/arsonist)

14th-century churches in Sweden
Churches in Västra Götaland County
Churches in the Diocese of Skara
Church frescos in Sweden
2001 fires in Europe
Wooden churches in Sweden